Fuqua Farm is a historic farm property at 8700 Bethia Road in rural Chesterfield County, Virginia. The farmhouse now includes elements of two structures that were joined about 1905; in addition to the farmhouse there are also early 20th-century outbuildings, including a chicken house, garage, and shed.

The farm was listed on the National Register of Historic Places in 2017.

See also
National Register of Historic Places listings in Chesterfield County, Virginia

References

Farms in Virginia
Houses on the National Register of Historic Places in Virginia
Houses completed in 1785
Houses in Chesterfield County, Virginia
National Register of Historic Places in Chesterfield County, Virginia
1785 establishments in Virginia